Cypraeopsis is an extinct genus of sea snails, marine gastropod mollusks in the family Ovulidae, one of the families of cowry allies.

Species
Species within the genus Cypraeopsis include:
 † Cypraeopsis aquensis Dolin & Lozouet, 2004
 † Cypraeopsis vandervlerki Schilder, 1936 
Species brought into synonymy
 Cypraeopsis superstes Dolin, 1991: synonym of Lunovula superstes (Dolin, 1991)

References

 Dolin, L. & Lozouet, P., 2004. Nouvelles espèces de Gastéropodes (Mollusca: Gastropoda) de l'Oligocène et du Miocène inférieur de l'Aquitaine (Sud-Ouest de la France). Partie 3. Cypraeidae et Ovulidae. Cossmanniana: 164 pp, sér. hors série n°4

Pediculariinae